Kinga Bóta (born 22 August 1977) is a Hungarian sprint canoer who competed from 1999 to 2005. She won silver medal in the K-4 500 m event at the 2004 Summer Olympics in Athens.

Bóta has also had outstanding success at the ICF Canoe Sprint World Championships, winning twelve medals. This included ten golds (K-2 500 m: 2001, 2002, 2003; K-2 1000 m: 2002, K-4 500 m: 2001, 2002, 2003; K-4 1000 m: 2001, 2005) and two bronzes (K-2 1000 m: 1999, K-4 500 m: 2005).

References

External links
 
 

1977 births
Canoeists at the 2004 Summer Olympics
Hungarian female canoeists
Living people
Olympic canoeists of Hungary
Olympic silver medalists for Hungary
Olympic medalists in canoeing
ICF Canoe Sprint World Championships medalists in kayak
Medalists at the 2004 Summer Olympics